Kibalino is a rural locality (a selo) in Ivolginsky District, Republic of Buryatia, Russia. The population was 176 as of 2010. There is 1 street.

Geography 
Kibalino is located 49 km southwest of Ivolginsk (the district's administrative centre) by road. Orongoy is the nearest rural locality.

References 

Rural localities in Ivolginsky District